Bolton Street Park was a baseball field in Savannah, Georgia, which was home to the city's professional baseball clubs between 1885 and 1909, including the Savannah Indians from 1904 to 1909, and hosted Major League Baseball spring training between 1892 and 1908. The ballpark was located between Bolton Street and Park Avenue east of the railroad tracks running parallel to East Broad Street.

History

The National League Detroit Wolverines beat the Southern Association's Savannah team 4-2 in an exhibition game at Bolton Street Park on March 20, 1886.

The Washington Senators trained in Savannah at the ballpark in March 1892.

Prior to the 1894 season, Jeff Miller, owner of the Savannah Southern League club, renovated the grandstand to include 500 open chairs, and added a cupola to shield the press, expanded the bleachers, as well as designated areas for carriages and hitching posts.

Between the 1870s and 1900s, the Chatham Base Ball Club, based in Savannah, was a championship Black baseball club that often played its games at Bolton Street Park.

The South Atlantic League was formed in November 1903 at the Hotel DeSoto in Savannah. Savannah was one of six charter clubs. On April 26, 1904, Savannah lost to the Charleston Sea Gulls in their first South Atlantic League game before a crowd of 3,200 at the ballpark.

Present site

Fairmount Baptist Church had been founded in 1902, and erected its church building at 57th and Waters Streets. The membership acquired the former ballpark site in 1951, and moved its church building to the site at 721 E Bolton Street.

In March 2022, the Shoeless Joe Jackson Museum and Baseball Library opened a community book box at the site of the former Bolton Street Park by Fairmount Baptist Church. Shoeless Joe Jackson had played for the 1909 Savannah Indians and won the league batting title playing his games at Bolton Street Park.

References

External links

Baseball venues in Georgia (U.S. state)
Defunct minor league baseball venues
Defunct sports venues in Georgia (U.S. state)
Minor league baseball venues
New York Giants (NL) spring training venues
New York Yankees spring training venues
Philadelphia Phillies spring training venues
Spring training ballparks